"Sarà perché ti amo" ("It must be so because I love you") is the sixth single of Italo disco group Ricchi e Poveri.

History 
The song was released in February 1981 on Baby Records and premiered live at the 31st edition of the famous Festival di Sanremo in 1981. The song featured also on the album . The song was included in the musical score of Claude Miller's An Impudent Girl (1985), and in Italy the film was subsequently released as "Sarà perché ti amo". It is also part of the soundtrack of the 2003 French horror film High Tension.

Track list 
 "Sarà perché ti amo" (3:09)	
 "Bello l'amore" (3:21)

Chart performance

Sales and certifications

Thalía version 

The Spanish cover "Será porque te amo" is the second single from Thalía's studio album Lunada (2008). The song was written by Dario Farina, Daniele Pace, Luis Gómez Escolar and Enzo Ghinazzi and produced by Emilio Estefan.

"Será porque te amo" was released only as a radio single across Latin America. Despite not having a music video and virtually no promotion, the song become a moderate hit. Also, in some cases managed higher positions at airplays than "Ten Paciencia" which was fully promoted.

"Será porque te amo" is Thalía's last official single released by EMI music.

Track listing 
Official Versions
Será porque te amo (Album Version) – 2:41

Chart performance

Other cover versions 
 1981: Los Abejorros - “Será Porque Te Amo” (Costa Rica)
 1982: Laban - "Hvor ska' vi sove i nat" (Denmark)
 1982: Perikles - "Var ska vi sova i natt" (Sweden)
 1982: Mighty Band - "Var ska vi sova inatt" (Sweden)
 1983: Los Chicos - "Sera Porque Te Amo" (Puerto Rico)
 1985: Alain Jomy in French for the soundtrack for the Drama film An Impudent Girl
 1991 Je m'envole avec toi in french from collage (Canadian Band)
 2001: Těžkej Pokondr - "Hej, volá, volá Sisa" (Czech Republic)
 2003: Eu4ya - Sara' Perche' Ti Amo (2003 Remix)
 2003: Maïwenn feat. Cécile de France - Sara' Perche' Ti Amo (Haute Tension soundtrack)
 2008: Diana Sorbello - "Das ist weil ich dich liebe" (Germany)
 2010: Fabrizio - Hei kom iech zeker trök (Netherlands)
2011: Ninel Conde - Será porque Te Amo

References 

1981 songs
1981 singles
Italo disco songs
Italian-language songs
Thalía songs
2008 singles
Spanish-language songs
Songs written by Luis Gómez Escolar
EMI Latin singles
Ricchi e Poveri songs
Songs written by Dario Farina
Songs written by Daniele Pace
Sanremo Music Festival songs

it:Será porque te amo
hu:Será porque te amo
pt:Será porque te amo
tr:Será porque te amo